Makarud (also Romanized as Makārūd and Makarood; also known as Makāru) is a village in Kelardasht-e Gharbi Rural District, Kelardasht District, Chalus County, Mazandaran Province, Iran. At the 2006 census, its population was 922, in 259 families.

References 

Populated places in Chalus County